Piero Mariani (born December 4, 1911 in Mortata) was an Italian professional football player.

1911 births
Year of death missing
Italian footballers
Serie A players
Novara F.C. players
Inter Milan players
Calcio Lecco 1912 players
Association football midfielders
Vigevano Calcio players